Pliomeridae is a family of phacopide trilobites, containing the following genera:

Anapliomera
Benedettia
Canningella
Colobinion
Coplacoparia
Cybelopsis
Ectenonotus
Encrinurella
Evropeites
Gogoella
Guizhoupliomerops
Hawleia
Hintzeia
Humaencrinuroides
Ibexaspis
Josephulus
Kanoshia
Leiostrototropis
Liexiaspis
Ngaricephalus
Obliteraspis
Ovalocephalus
Parahawleia
Parapliomera
Perissopliomera
Placoparia
Pliomera
Pliomerella
Pliomeridius
Pliomerina
Pliomerops
Protoencrinurella
Protopliomerella
Protopliomerops
Pseudocybele
Pseudomera
Quinquecosta
Rossaspis
Strotactinus
Tesselacauda
Tienshihfuia
Tzuchiatocnemis

References

 
Trilobite families
Paleozoic life of Newfoundland and Labrador
Fossil taxa described in 1913